Timothy Barnwell (born July 26, 1967, in New Jersey), better known by the stage name Headliner, is an American DJ and businessman. He is best known for being a member of Arrested Development. Speech met Headliner at the Art Institute of Atlanta, where they were both students.

Headliner left Arrested Development in 1996 and did not participate in the group's reunion in 2000, unlike fellow ex-member Rasa Don, who returned to the band for another six years and, with whom he would eventually establish the Creative Royalty production house. Headliner also runs his own children's edutainment brand called the Sandtown All-Stars.

References

External links
 DJ Headliner on Instagram

1967 births
American DJs
Grammy Award winners
Living people
People from New Jersey
21st-century American businesspeople
Arrested Development (group) members